Didrik Nielssøn Muus (1633 – 7 February 1706) was a Norwegian priest, painter, copper engraver and sculptor. 

Muus was born at Stange  in Hedmark, Norway. He was the son of Niels Rasmussen Muus (1595–1663) and Marichen Didriksdatter Nøff (died ca 1660). Muus attended to school in Roskilde and became a student in theological studies at the  University of Copenhagen in 1653. He graduated in 1659. He served as chaplain to the priest in Ringsaker from 1661.  In 1686, Muus was offered the position of vicar at Stord where he would serve for the next 20 years. He painted several altarpieces, epitaphs and portraits, and is regarded as a forerunner of other artists.

Personal life
Muus married ca. 1667 with a noble woman and widow, Maren Skaktavl  (1624–1718).  He died at Stord in Hordaland during 1706.

References

1633 births
1706 deaths
People from Hedmark
University of Copenhagen alumni
18th-century Norwegian Lutheran clergy
17th-century Norwegian painters
18th-century Norwegian painters
18th-century male artists
Norwegian male painters
17th-century Norwegian Lutheran clergy